"River" is a song by American rapper Eminem featuring English singer-songwriter Ed Sheeran. It is the fifth track from his ninth solo studio album Revival (2017). The song was written by the artists alongside producer Emile Haynie. "River" was released to radio on December 15, 2017 (alongside the rest of the album) in Italy, and in the UK on January 5, 2018, as the album's second single. The music video received a nomination for Best Cinematography at the 2018 MTV Video Music Awards. "River" details the struggles of a failing relationship that culminates in an abortion.

Release and promotion

The song was released on the radio on January 5, 2018. An audio video was uploaded to Eminem's YouTube channel on December 15, 2017. As of October 3, 2021, the video has over 208 million views.

Reception
Spin magazine panned it, saying that it's "a song whose perfection of form is matched only by its emptiness of content. It could be beautiful."

Commercial performance
Commercially, it reached number one in the United Kingdom, making it Eminem's ninth number one there and Sheeran's fifth. It also reached number one in Austria, Norway, Scotland and Sweden as well as the top 10 in Australia, Canada, Denmark, Finland, Germany, Hungary, Ireland, Italy, Lebanon, the Netherlands, New Zealand, Portugal, Switzerland, and the top 20 in Belgium and the United States.

Music video
A music video for the song was released on February 14, 2018. It was directed by Emil Nava. The video garnered over 5 million views in the first 24 hours of its release. As of October 2022, the video has been viewed over 188  million times and has accumulated over 2.6 million likes. The music video received a nomination for Best Cinematography at the 2018 MTV Video Music Awards.

In their review of the video, Fuse described some of the scenes as "tense and serious", further stating that a "dark-haired Eminem plays the role so well and raps rhymes about making a woman give up her baby so convincingly, it's not entirely clear what's true and what's made up."

Live performances
Eminem and Ed Sheeran performed the song live together for the first (and to date, only) time on the final night of Eminem's Revival Tour at Twickenham Stadium on July 15, 2018.

Awards and nominations

Charts

Weekly charts

Year-end charts

Certifications

|-
! scope="row"| Portugal (AFP)
|Gold
|5,000
|-

Release history

See also
 List of number-one urban singles of 2018 (Australia)
 List of number-one hits of 2018 (Austria)
 List of number-one songs in Norway
 List of Scottish number-one singles of 2018
 List of number-one singles of the 2010s (Sweden)
 List of UK Singles Chart number ones of the 2010s

References

External links

2017 songs
Eminem songs
Ed Sheeran songs
Songs written by Eminem
Songs written by Ed Sheeran
Songs written by Emile Haynie
UK Singles Chart number-one singles
Number-one singles in Austria
Number-one singles in Norway
Number-one singles in Scotland
Number-one singles in Sweden
2018 singles
Songs about abortion
Song recordings produced by Emile Haynie
Songs about rivers
Pop-rap songs
Rap rock songs